Cho Seung-youn (born August 5, 1996), known professionally as Woodz (stylized in all caps), is a South Korean singer-songwriter, rapper, dancer, and record producer. He first rose to fame as the main rapper and sub-vocalist of South Korean-Chinese boy band Uniq, formed by Yuehua Entertainment in 2014. He co-founded the musical collectives M.O.L.A in 2015 and Drinkcolor in 2016. In 2018, he co-founded his personal production team, Team HOW.

Following an appearance on the fifth season of the South Korean rap competition show Show Me the Money, Woodz debuted as a solo artist under the stage name Luizy in July 2016, with the release of the collaborative hip-hop single "Recipe". He subsequently changed his stage name to Woodz in 2018, reflecting changes in musical direction. His releases as Woodz, including the singles "Pool", "Different", and "meaningless", delved into alternative R&B and featured Woodz transitioning from rap to vocals. In addition to his solo work, he has written and produced songs for artists in both his native South Korea and China, as well as for the shows The Unit: Idol Rebooting Project and Idol Producer.

In 2019, Woodz participated in the South Korean survival show Produce X 101. He finished in fifth place, making him a member of the show's derivative boy band, X1. He debuted with X1 under Swing Entertainment in August 2019. Following the group's disbandment on January 6, 2020, in the aftermath of the Mnet vote manipulation investigation, he resumed his solo career as Woodz, releasing his first EP Equal on June 29, 2020, with the title track "Love Me Harder".

Early life and education
Cho Seung-youn was born on August 5, 1996, in Seoul, South Korea. Raised as an only child, his parents both worked as businesspeople: his mother owned a Chinese restaurant in Cheongdam-dong as well as a travel agency in Sinsa-dong, both in the Gangnam district of Seoul; while his father owned a Korean restaurant in the Philippines. Due to his family's business obligations, he often moved during his childhood.

Initially intending to pursue a professional career in association football, Woodz was accepted into the youth development system of Campeonato Brasileiro Série A club Sport Club Corinthians Paulista and moved to Brazil during his final year of elementary school, where he resided in the São Paulo municipalities of Penápolis and Santos. As a teenager, he played as a main striker for Sport Club Corinthians Paulista's junior affiliate team for two years; as is customary for Brazilian football players, he adopted a Portuguese mononym, Luizinho. He later attended Reedley International School in Manila, Philippines, for one year to learn English.

Growing up, Woodz was not fond of urban music, such as K-pop, and primarily listened to Korean ballad. However, when Woodz began to experience homesickness while studying abroad, he turned to watching episodes of the South Korean music program Music Bank in order to cope. Inspired by the song "Let's Go On a Vacation" by Lee Seung-gi, he returned to South Korea to pursue a musical career.
He enrolled in Hanlim Multi Art School in the Practical Dance Department but started one year late due to his time overseas. After graduating from Hanlim in 2016, he was admitted to Dong-ah Institute of Media and Arts' Division of Entertainment in Broadcasting.

Career

2014–2015: Career beginnings

Woodz auditioned more than 50 times to various entertainment companies, such as SM Entertainment and JYP Entertainment, before being accepted as a trainee at YG Entertainment. He had been training at YG for one and a half years before he joined the UNIQ pre-debut team. UNIQ, a multinational collaboration managed by Yuehua Entertainment, had its members cooperatively trained by both Chinese company Yuehua and South Korean company YG in the lead up to their official debut in both countries. Woodz's first public appearance with UNIQ was on October 16, 2014, when the group performed on the music program M Countdown. The group's debut single "Falling in Love", recorded in both Mandarin and Korean, was released in both China and South Korea four days later on October 20. Their first mini album EOEO, also recorded in both Mandarin and Korean, was released in both countries on April 24, 2015.

As the group's main rapper and sub-vocalist, Cho was involved in UNIQ's musical direction from their debut, penning his own rap verses as well as other lyrics for their Korean releases. When UNIQ's Korean promotions as a full group became more infrequent starting in the latter half of 2015 due to rising political tensions between China and South Korea, other members of the group began engaging in individual activities, such as acting; however, Woodz opted not to follow this career route, expressing a desire to focus on the musical aspect of his career. On August 14, 2015, the formation of the musical collective M.O.L.A was announced via the release of the song "My Way" on YouTube, featuring Woodz as one of its founding members alongside 15&'s Park Ji-min and producer NATHAN. Three more members—Pentagon's Kino, Seventeen's Vernon, and guitarist Hoho—later joined the collective.

2016–2018: Solo debut and foray into music production
In 2016, Woodz applied to participate in the rap competition show Show Me the Money 5; he had previously applied for the show's fourth season but was unable to participate due to conflicts with Uniq's EOEO promotions. Although eliminated in the early rounds of the show, he drew positive attention from its viewership. After his appearance on Show Me the Money 5, he went on to co-found the production crew Drinkcolor alongside fellow producers EDEN, ODDTOM, and M.O.L.A member NATHAN on July 26, 2016. Woodz then made his solo debut under the stage name Luizy three days later on July 29, with the self-produced hip-hop single "Recipe", a collaboration with fellow Show Me the Money 5 competitor Flowsik. He co-wrote the track with Flowsik, with whom he had struck up a friendship during the show's run. Following this, he released his first single as sole lead artist, "Baby Ride", on August 14, 2016; the title track featured BtoB member Im Hyun-sik. Cho collaborated with Im again in March 2017 for his first participation in an OST as a soloist with the single "Eating Alone", included on the OST for the music variety show Sing For You. Six months later, he made his first appearance as a featured artist on Lee Gi-kwang's song "Dream".

In November 2017, music publishing and production company ICONIC SOUNDS announced that Woodz was one of the artists invited to participate in their annual songwriting and production camp. There, he met singer-songwriter Sophia Pae, with whom he would co-produce the song "Always". "Always" would then be featured on the survival show The Unit: Idol Rebooting Project in January 2018, where it was performed by the unit Blossom and released as a digital single as part of the show's fourth mission. This was Woodz's first time producing a track for another artist; it also marked a brief transitional period in which he ceased using the name Luizy, as he was instead credited under his legal name for "Always".

He was first credited under the name Woodz in February 2018 with the release of singer and producer EDEN's album RYU : 川, for which he co-produced the track "93" and featured on the track "Dance". As Woodz, Cho continued to write and produce songs for other artists in the following months, beginning with the debut evaluation song "it's ok" for the Chinese survival show Idol Producer in April 2018. In July, he co-produced the single "ZIGZAG" for C-pop project group MR-X; he would also co-produce their next single "I Don't Wanna Fight Tonight", released two months later. In August, singer and musician Jun released his solo debut single "Hold It Down", which Woodz wrote and co-produced. In the same month, he co-produced the song "Evanesce II" for Super Junior-D&E's third EP Bout You. In October, R&B singer Babylon released the album Caelo, for which Woodz co-wrote and produced the tracks "Sincerity" and "Drive".

Concurrent with his other musical activities, Yuehua Entertainment announced that he would officially start using the stage name Woodz during his promotions as a soloist in May 2018. His first release as lead artist under the Woodz name, the digital single titled "Pool", was released on May 12, 2018, followed by the single "Different" on July 21 the same year. Both songs were co-produced by Woodz with AOMG's Cha Cha Malone. In a further expansion of his creative independence within Yuehua, the formation of his personal production team TEAM HOW, composed of manager Lee Il-kyu, stylist Kim Hyup, graphic designer Robbroy, and co-producer and fellow M.O.L.A member NATHAN, was revealed through the eponymous mini documentary series HOW: how ordinary, we're on October 23, 2018. The digital single "meaningless" was released on November 3, 2018.

2019: Produce X 101 and X1

Woodz remained active in the music industry in the early months of 2019. In January, he co-produced the track "This Night", included on Groovy Room's single of the same name. The following month, boy group ONF released the track "Ice & Fire" on their third EP We Must Love, which Woodz had co-written and produced. On March 4, 2019, the survival show Produce X 101 began filming; Woodz was first revealed to be participating as a contestant two weeks later on March 20. However, he continued to work as a lyricist and producer while filming for Produce X 101, up until the show began airing in May 2019: in late March, singer-songwriter Suran released her second EP, Jumpin, for which he co-wrote and produced the title track "Don't Hang Up"; in April he co-produced "Blossom", a promotional song performed by VIXX's Ravi and GFriend's Eunha for Pepsi and Starship Entertainment's K-pop collaboration project "For the Love of It".

In the second episode of Produce X 101, Woodz auditioned as one of three trainees representing Yuehua Entertainment with the self-written and produced song "Dream". He placed 67th in the show's first ranking in May 2019, and did not enter the top ten until the show's penultimate episode. Woodz finished fifth in the finale on July 19, becoming the trainee with the lowest initial rank to earn a spot in the final lineup of the band X1, and the only trainee to consistently rise in rank over the course of the show. He debuted as a member of X1 on August 27, 2019, with the release of the EP Emergency: Quantum Leap. Due to a vote manipulation controversy involving multiple Mnet franchises including Produce X 101, the group ultimately disbanded on January 6, 2020.

2020–present: Return to solo activities
Woodz made a solo comeback as Woodz on June 29, 2020, with his first extended play Equal with the title track "Love Me Harder" (파랗게). His showcase was held online on the V LIVE platform on the same day. Over 320,000 users watched the showcase concurrently and it amassed over 200 million 'hearts' on the platform. He promoted on Korean music shows with "Love Me Harder" (파랗게) and B-side "Accident". He also performed various different stages with other B-side tracks from "Equal", including "Buck".

Woodz made another comeback with the release of his second extended play Woops! on November 17, 2020, with the title track "Bump Bump".  He promoted on Korean music shows with "Bump Bump" and B-side "Trigger" (방아쇠).

Woodz returned with his new single album Set on March 15, 2021, with the title track "Feel Like".
Woodz made a comeback with his third extended play Only Lovers Left on October 5, 2021, with the double title tracks "Kiss of Fire" and "Waiting". He co-produced and co-wrote three songs in English for his international fans as well as to take a leap forward globally in regards to the reach of his music. With this album, he achieved his first win as a soloist on The Show.

Woodz released his fourth extended play Colorful Trauma on May 4, 2022, with the title track "I Hate You".

On July 15, it was announced that Woodz will be holding the WOODZ LIVE COLORFUL in Bangkok concert in Bangkok, Thailand on September 3 at 5:00 PM (local time).

On October 5, it was announced that Woodz's exclusive contract with Yuehua Entertainment would be expiring on October 19.

On October 25, it was announced that Woodz had signed an exclusive contract with EDAM Entertainment.

In February 2023, the agency released a new teaser for the song "Abyss" on Woodz' 5th mini album.

Musical style and themes 

As a solo artist, Woodz has been involved in writing all of his lyrics and producing most of his music. In the early stages of his career, Woodz's musical style gravitated towards hip hop, with his releases under the name Luizy also incorporating pop and electronic music. However, the change of his stage name as a soloist to Woodz in 2018 was accompanied by a change in musical direction, described by Status Magazine as an "[evolution] into a more realized identity". As opposed to his "poppier" approach as Luizy, Woodz characterizes his production style under the Woodz name as "mostly [...] R&B", but mentions that he is "not picky about the genre". Commentators have also noted his experimentation with genres, with his music as Woodz being identified as possessing elements of alternative R&B, atmospheric music, and dream pop while retaining a "signature climatic sound". In a further artistic contrast to his early career, which featured him primarily as a rapper, his releases as Woodz feature Woodz primarily as a vocalist. In retrospect, Woodz described the difference between his personas as a "matter of maturity", with the change to the more "mature" Woodz identity allowing him to distance himself from his "comparatively young" and immature identity as Luizy.

Woodz's songs have featured a variety of concepts and themes; "Recipe", released shortly after his elimination from Show Me the Money 5, was noted to express "ambition" and defiance in the face of public scrutiny, while "Baby Ride" was characterized as a "cool, cheerful" song that helps listeners "escape the midsummer heat". Contrasting aspects of love and relationships were often the themes of his subsequent releases as Woodz: "Pool" was described by Status Magazine as a "gleeful", "jubilant love song"; whereas his follow-up single "Different" explored coming to terms with a break-up due to mutual incompatibility, with Maeil Business Newspaper writing that the song's lyrics are a "direct expression of the word 'different'". Compared to his previous work, however, Woodz's third single as Woodz, "Meaningless", was described as a "darker" record that tackles more personal and "existential" themes; critics also noted that the song discussed his mental health, a topic that is often considered taboo in South Korea. Woodz has referred to "meaningless" as akin to his "diary".

Discography

Extended plays

Single albums

Singles

Filmography

Film

Television shows

Radio shows

Web shows

Production credits

All credits are adapted from the Korea Music Copyright Association, unless stated otherwise.

Awards and nominations

Notes

References

External links

 
 
 

Living people
1996 births
Uniq (band) members
Singers from Seoul
Yuehua Entertainment artists
Swing Entertainment artists
K-pop singers
South Korean male idols
South Korean pop singers
South Korean rhythm and blues singers
South Korean hip hop singers
South Korean dance music singers
South Korean male dancers
South Korean record producers
Mandarin-language singers of South Korea
21st-century South Korean  male singers
Produce 101 contestants
Hanlim Multi Art School alumni
Dong-ah Institute of Media and Arts alumni
Reality show winners